A Humanitarian Device Exemption is an approval process provided by the United States Food and Drug Administration allowing a medical device to be marketed without requiring evidence of effectiveness. The FDA calls a device approved in this manner a "Humanitarian Use Device" (HUD).

Requirements
To qualify, the device must be intended to benefit patients with a rare disease or condition (i.e. fewer than 8,000 people in the US annually). The applicant must also show that there is no other way that the device could be brought to market, and that there is no comparable device already available.

See also
Federal Food, Drug, and Cosmetic Act
Premarket approval

Notes

Food and Drug Administration